A Drum Is a Woman is a musical allegory by American pianist, composer, and bandleader Duke Ellington and his long-time musical collaborator Billy Strayhorn. It tells the story of Madam Zajj, the personification of African rhythm, and Carribee Joe, who has his roots firmly in the jungle with his drums. Zajj travels out into the world seeking fame and sophistication and melds with the influences of cultures she weaves through the story, which gives a brief history of the rise of jazz and bebop.

Originally recorded for the Columbia label in 1956, it was produced for television on the US Steel hour on May 8, 1957. The album was re-released on CD in 2004 with a bonus track. A stage performance was produced by Marc Stager June 24, 1988, at Symphony Space in New York City with pianist and arranger Chris Cherney leading the orchestra and Duke's son Mercer Ellington narrating.

Reception
Jack Tracy stated in his five-star DownBeat review: "A Drum is a Woman is the most ambitious project attempted by Duke Ellington in years. It is a capsule history of jazz, it is a history of the Negro in America, it is a history of the Ellington orchestra, and it is a folk opera... But more than any of these it is a revealing self-portrait of Duke Ellington."

The New York Times reviewer John S. Wilson commented on the 1988 performance: Unlike other extended Ellington works, which are primarily if not entirely instrumental, "A Drum Is a Woman" is developed through songs and a narration with only occasional full orchestral passages. It was powerful, rhythmic and kaleidoscopic, with a strong vocal anchor at Friday's performance in Claudia Hamilton, a commanding presence as Madam Zajj. Luke Dogen's Carabea [sic] Joe was a genial, good-time companion with a strong inner core that emerged in a positively stated love song, "You Better Know It."

The AllMusic review by Scott Yanow awarded the album 2 stars and stated: "Dominated by vocals and narration, the music often plays a backseat to the story, which is worth hearing twice at the most".

Track listing
 
Recorded at Columbia Records 30th Street Studio, New York on September 17 (tracks 1, 6, 7 & 13), September 24 (tracks 2 & 3), September 25 (tracks 5, 8, 10 & 14), September 28 (tracks 4 & 12), October 23 (track 11) & December 6 (tracks 9 & 15), 1956.

Personnel
Duke Ellington – piano, narration
Cat Anderson, Willie Cook, Ray Nance, Clark Terry – trumpet
Quentin Jackson, Britt Woodman – trombone
John Sanders – valve trombone
Jimmy Hamilton – clarinet, tenor saxophone
Rick Henderson – alto saxophone
Russell Procope – alto saxophone, clarinet
Paul Gonsalves – tenor saxophone
Harry Carney – baritone saxophone
Jimmy Woode – bass
Sam Woodyard – - drums
Cándido Camero – percussion
Joya Sherrill (5, 6, 12, 13, 14), Margaret Tynes (1, 8, 15, 16), Ozzie Bailey (3, 9, 15, 16) – vocals

References

Columbia Records albums
Duke Ellington albums
1956 albums
Albums recorded at CBS 30th Street Studio